Bluffing means attempting to deceive or mislead and may refer to:

 Deception
 Bluffing (cards), various tactics in certain card games designed to mislead one's opponents
 Bluff (poker), to attempt to mislead other players in poker about the strength of one's hand